Monica Graziana Contrafatto (born 9 March 1981 in Gela) is an Italian Paralympic athlete. She competed at the  2016 Summer Paralympics, in 100m  T42, winning a bronze medal. She competed at the 2020 Summer Paralympics, in 100m T63.

Biography
A soldier of the Italian Army's 1st Bersaglieri Regiment Contrafatto was injured on 24 March 2012, during a mortar attack on Forward Operating Base "Ice" in Gulistan District, Farah Province in Afghanistan. As a consequence of her injuries her right leg had to be amputated.

Achievements

See also
Italy at the 2016 Summer Paralympics
Italy at the 2020 Summer Paralympics

Notes

References

External links
 

1981 births
Living people
Paralympic athletes of Italy
Paralympic bronze medalists for Italy
Athletes (track and field) at the 2012 Summer Paralympics
Athletes (track and field) at the 2016 Summer Paralympics
Medalists at the 2016 Summer Paralympics
Athletics competitors of Gruppo Sportivo Esercito
Paralympic medalists in athletics (track and field)
Athletes (track and field) at the 2020 Summer Paralympics
Italian female sprinters
20th-century Italian women
21st-century Italian women